Necrodome is a 1996 first-person vehicular combat game developed by Raven Software and published by Strategic Simulations. It supports online multiplayer matches. This includes cooperative multiplayer in which one player drives the vehicle and the other controls its turret. The game offers arena based car combat, first person driving, and the ability to exit the vehicle and do battle on foot. When on foot, the player has access to a tribarrel shotgun and the ability to hijack damaged opponents. The score was composed by Kevin Schilder.

Reception

Reviewers decried the game's lack of originality, but offered some praise for its multiplayer mode. GameSpot said, "If you're starved for more vehicular shooter action then you might want to try this title out." They awarded this game a score of 5.4 (mediocre).

References

External links
Necrodome at MobyGames

1996 video games
Post-apocalyptic video games
Raven Software games
Strategic Simulations games
Vehicular combat games
Video games developed in the United States
Windows games
Windows-only games
First-person shooters
Sprite-based first-person shooters
Video games with 2.5D graphics
Mindscape games